This is a list of Billboard magazine's Top Hot 100 songs of 1973. The Top 100, as revealed in the year-end edition of Billboard dated December 29, 1973, is based on Hot 100 charts from the issue dates of November 25, 1972 through November 17, 1973.

See also
1973 in music
List of Billboard Hot 100 number-one singles of 1973
List of Billboard Hot 100 top-ten singles in 1973

References

1973 record charts
Billboard charts